A naming collision is a circumstance where two or more identifiers in a given namespace or a given scope cannot be unambiguously resolved, and such unambiguous resolution is a requirement of the underlying system.

Example: XML element names 
In XML, element names can be originated and changed to reflect the type of information contained in the document. This level of flexibility may cause problems if separate documents encode different kinds of information, but use the same identifiers for the element names.

For example, the following sample document defines the basic semantics for a "person" document and a "book" document. Both of these use a "title" element, but the meaning is not the same:
<root>
    <person>
        <fname>Nancy</fname>
        <lname>Davolio</lname>
        <title>Dr.</title>
        <age>29</age>
    </person>
    
    <book>
        <title>Harry Potter And The Cursed Child</title>
        <isbn>ABCD1234567</isbn>
    </book>
</root>
For an application to allow a user to correctly query for and retrieve the "title" element, it must provide a way to unambiguously specify which title element is being requested. Failure to do so would give rise to a naming collision on the title element (as well as any other elements that shared this unintended similarity).

In the preceding example, there is enough information in the structure of the document itself (which is specified by the "root" element) to provide a means of unambiguously resolving element names. 

For example, using XPath:

    //root/person/title          ;; the formal title for a person
    //root/book/title            ;; the title of a book

Collision domain

The term collision domain may also be used to refer to a system in which a single name or identifier is open to multiple interpretations by different layers or processing.  The notion of a namespace has been widely adopted as a software programming practice to avert undesired clashes. Note that its use in the networking field is superficially similar, but quite different in reality.

See also
 Name collision
 Namespace
 XML Namespaces
 Delimiter collision

References

Programming constructs